The 2023–24 Kansas Jayhawks men's basketball team will represent the University of Kansas in the 2023–24 NCAA Division I men's basketball season, which will be Jayhawks' 126th basketball season. The Jayhawks, members of the Big 12 Conference, will play their home games at Allen Fieldhouse in Lawrence, Kansas. They will be led by 21st year Hall of Fame head coach Bill Self.

Offseason

Players graduated
Below are players who ran out of eligibility or seniors that did not declare intent for a 5th year as allowed by the NCAA due to the COVID-19 pandemic.

Entered NBA draft
Players listed below are underclassmen who have entered the 2023 NBA draft. Class provided is class from previous season.

2023 recruiting class

|-
| colspan="7" style="padding-left:10px;" | Overall recruiting rankings:     247 Sports: 12'     Rivals: 12       ESPN: 13''' 
|}

Roster
This is a preliminary roster based on the 2022–23 roster with outgoing players removed and incoming players added. The roster may undergo multiple changes before the beginning of the season as recruits commit, incoming and outgoing transfers announce their intentions, and players declare for the draft. Roster will be updated as these occur.

Schedule
The Jayhawks non-conference schedule will be released in the summer and the conference schedule will be released in the fall. Confirmed games will include Kentucky in the Champions Classic and Missouri. The Big 12 has yet to announce how it will handle conference play for basketball with the additions of BYU, Cincinnati, Houston, and UCF to the Big 12. The schedule will likely include at least one game against each Big 12 team. Due to tournament format, the Jayhawks will be guaranteed at least one game in the 2024 Big 12 tournament.

References

Kansas Jayhawks men's basketball seasons
Kansas Jayhawks men's basketball